Abb Landis (August 9, 1856 – December 9, 1927) was an American lawyer, newspaper publisher, and actuary.

Abb Landis was born in Bedford County, Tennessee, on August 9, 1856, to A. L. Landis, a plantation owner. He graduated from the University of Nashville in 1875, followed by Vanderbilt University in 1876. Abb Landis subsequently completed a degree in law from Cumberland University's law school (now the Cumberland Law School at Samford University) in 1879. He practiced law until acquiring the Nashville Banner in 1883. Landis began working in fraternal insurance starting in 1889. He was elected a fellow of the Casualty Actuarial Society in 1915, and, five years later, was given an equivalent honor by the American Statistical Association. Landis died in Nashville, Tennessee, on December 9, 1927.

References

1856 births
1927 deaths
Tennessee lawyers
19th-century American newspaper publishers (people)
Editors of Tennessee newspapers
People from Bedford County, Tennessee
Fellows of the American Statistical Association
American actuaries
University of Nashville alumni
Vanderbilt University alumni
Cumberland School of Law alumni
19th-century American lawyers